Matteo's Dream is an all-abilities playground in an urban park in Concord, California. It opened on May 16, 2007. Matteo Henderson was a boy with serious disabilities including blindness, cerebral palsy, and cognitive development. He used a wheelchair for transportation. Matteo, and many other children of all abilities have enjoyed the playground. Persons with disabilities are able to drive their wheelchairs directly onto the structure. Features of the playground are specially engineered to accommodate people with various disabilities. Matteo died on March 16, 2011, at the age of11. In January 2014, a Matteo's Dream themed Rose Parade float was featured in the 125th Rose Parade in Pasadena, California.

See also 
 Camp STAR
 Columbus Park
 Lake Alford Park
 Reverchon Park
 Sugar Sand Park
 Warriors' Path State Park

References

External links 

 

Playground equipment
Playgrounds
Tournament of Roses